In the visual arts, interlace is a decorative element found in  medieval art. In interlace, bands or portions of other motifs are looped, braided, and knotted in complex geometric patterns, often to fill a space. Interlacing is common in the Migration period art of Northern Europe, in the early medieval Insular art of Ireland and the British Isles, and Norse art of the Early Middle Ages, and in Islamic art.

Intricate braided and interlaced patterns, called plaits in British usage, first appeared in late Roman art in various parts of Europe, in mosaic floors and other media.  Coptic manuscripts and textiles of 5th- and 6th-century Christian Egypt are decorated with broad-strand ribbon interlace ornament bearing a "striking resemblance" to the earliest types of knotwork found in the Insular art manuscripts of Ireland and the  British Isles.

History and application

Northern Europe
Interlace is a key feature of the "Style II" animal style decoration of Migration Period art, and is found widely across Northern Europe, and was carried by the Lombards into Northern Italy.  Typically the long "ribbons" eventually terminate in an animal's head.  By about 700 it becomes less common in most of Europe, but continues to develop in the British Isles and Scandinavia, where it is found on metalwork, woodcarving, runestones, high crosses, and illuminated manuscripts of the 7th to 12th centuries.  Artist George Bain has characterised the early Insular knotwork found in the 7th-century Book of Durrow and the Durham Cathedral Gospel Book fragment as "broken and rejoined" braids. Whether Coptic braid patterns were transmitted directly to Hiberno-Scottish monasteries from the eastern Mediterranean or came via Lombardic Italy is uncertain. Art historian James Johnson Sweeney argued for direct communication between the scriptoria of Early Christian Ireland and the Coptic monasteries of Egypt. 
 
This new style featured elongated beasts intertwined into symmetrical shapes, and can be dated to the mid-7th century based on the accepted dating of examples in the Sutton Hoo treasure.   The most elaborate interlaced zoomorphics occur in Viking Age art of the Urnes style (arising before 1050), where tendrils of foliate designs intertwine with the stylized animals.

The full-flowering of Northern European interlace occurred in the Insular art of the British Isles, where the animal style ornament of Northern Europe blended with ribbon knotwork and Christian influences in such works as the Book of Kells and the Cross of Cong.  Whole carpet pages were illuminated with abstract patterns, including much use of interlace, and stone high crosses combined interlace panels with figurative ones.  Insular interlace was copied in continental Europe, closely in the Franco-Saxon school of the 8th to 11th centuries, and less so in other Carolingian schools of illumination, where the tendency was to foliate decorative forms.  In Romanesque art these became typical, and the interlace generally much less complex.  Some animal forms are also found.

Islamic art

Geometric interlacing patterns are common in Islamic ornament. They can be considered a particular type of arabesque. Umayyad architectural elements such as floor mosaics, window grilles, carvings and wall paintings, and decorative metal work of the 8th to 10th centuries are followed by the intricate interlacings common in later medieval Islamic art. Interlaced elaborations are also found in Kufic calligraphy.

Southern Europe
Interlace and knotwork are often found in Byzantine art, continuing Roman usage, but they are not given great prominence. One notable example of a widespread local usage of interlace is the three-ribbon interlace found in the early medieval Croatia on stone carvings from the 9th to 11th centuries.

Interlaces were widely used in times of Serbian Morava architectural school from the 14th to 15th century. They were used on and within churches and monasteries, as well as in religious literature.

Interlaces are also an important ornament used in Brâncovenesc architecture, an architectural style that evolved in Romania during the administration of Prince Constantin Brâncoveanu in the late 17th and early 18th centuries. Later, in the late 19th century and the first half of the 20th, it will be reused in Romanian Revival architecture.

Gallery

Notes

References

External links

Illustrated article by Peter Hubert on the origins of interlace sculpture. 

Medieval art
Decorative knots
Iconography
Celtic art
Ornaments
Insular art
Anglo-Saxon art
Islamic art
Visual motifs